= Ju Wu =

Chinese professional boxer (born 1999)

Ju Wu 吴举
Personal information
- Nationality: Chinese
- Born: 3 September 1999 (age 27) Jinan, China
- Height: 179 cm (5 ft 10 in)
- Weight: Lightweight

Boxing career
- Stance: Southpaw

Boxing record
- Total fights: 11
- Wins: 9
- Win by KO: 0
- Losses: 0
- Draws: 2

Ju Wu (Chinese: 吴举; pinyin: Wú jǔ; born 3 September 1999) is a Chinese professional boxer who has held the IBO International lightweight title since 2019.

== Professional boxing record ==
11 fights	9 wins	0 losses
By decision	9	0
Draws	2	

No.	Result	Record	Opponent	Type	Round, time	Date	Location	Notes
11	Win	9-0-2	(Switzerland) Alain Chervet	MD	10	26 Dec 2019	Kursaal, Bern, Switzerland	Won vacant IBO International lightweight title
10	Win	8–0–2	(Philippines) Rimar Metuda	UD	8	20 Jul 2019	ZTSSG Center, Qingdao, China	
9	Win	7–0–2	(Philippines) Adones Aguelo	UD	8	14 Jun 2019	TSSG Center, Qingdao, China	
8	Win	6–0–2	(Tanzania) Salimu Jengo	UD	8	23 Dec 2018	(China) Wansheng Binjiang Rd Venue, Chongqing	Won vacant WBO Asia Pacific Youth lightweight title
7	Win	5–0–2	(China) Peng Chen	UD	4	31 Aug 2018	Zi Space, Beijing, China	
6	Win	4–0–2	(China) Wenjie Lyu	UD	4	11 May 2018	Maida Energy Sports Center, Jinan, China	
5	Win	3–0–2	(China) Hao Wang	UD	4	30 Mar 2018	Maida Energy Sports Center, Jinan, China	
4	Win	2–0–2	(China) Zefeng Zhan	UD	4	22 Nov 2017	Futian Sports Park, Shenzhen, China	
3	Draw	1–0–2	(China) Lingjie Zha	PTS	4	17 Dec 2016	ONE SHOW SHOW SPACE, Shanghai, China	
2	Win	1–0–1	(China) Feng Zhang	UD	4	14 Oct 2016	Multi-Functional Hall, Water Cube, Beijing, China	
1	Draw	0–0–1	(China) Xiaolu Mu	SD	4	13 Aug 2016	Multi-Functional Hall, Water Cube, Beijing, China	
